Herbert Grevenius (7 October 1901 – 9 December 1993) was a Swedish screenwriter. He wrote for 30 films between 1943 and 1980.

Selected filmography

 The Old Clock at Ronneberga (1944)
 It Rains on Our Love (1946)
 Främmande hamn (1948)
 Thirst (1949)
 This Can't Happen Here (1950)
 Summer Interlude (1951)
 She Came Like the Wind (1952)
 U-Boat 39 (1952)
 Café Lunchrasten (1954)
 A Little Nest (1956)
 The Girl in Tails (1956)

References

External links

Swedish male screenwriters
1901 births
1993 deaths
20th-century Swedish screenwriters
20th-century Swedish male writers